Benjamin Maxwell may refer to:

 Ben Maxwell (born 1988), an ice hockey player for the Winnipeg Jets
 Captain Benjamin Maxwell, a character in the television series episode The Wounded (Star Trek: The Next Generation)